August David Krohn (1803–1891) was a Saint Petersburg born zoologist of German origin.  He was the son of Abraham Krohn, the founder of Russia's first brewery, who had left the island of Rügen to serve in the court of Catherine the Great.  He was the uncle of the fennoman folklorist Julius Krohn.  According to legend, Krohn is said to have left for Central Europe after losing to his younger brother Leopold the competition for the hand of a Vyborg mansion owner's 15-year-old daughter.  He remained unmarried until his death at the age of 88.

Krohn worked at the University of Bonn on zoology, anatomy and embryology.  He was a pioneer in marine biology and published essential works on Chaetognatha (Arrow Worms) in 1844 & 1853.  He was in correspondence with Charles Darwin and is said to have pointed out errors in Darwin's work in his thesis. 
The genus and species identified by him are marked with the author abbreviation Krohn.  He was the first to classify the phylum Rhombozoa of the kingdom Animalia.

The species Euphausia krohnii and Cliopsis krohnii and the family Eukrohniidae are named after him.

Publications

Books

Journals

See also 
 Johann Friedrich von Brandt

References 
 The Darwin Correspondence Online Database
 Krohn-suvun vaellustarina (in Finnish)
 Biographical Etymology of Marine Organism Names 

19th-century zoologists from the Russian Empire
Biologists from the Russian Empire
University of Bonn alumni
Scientists from Saint Petersburg
1891 deaths
1803 births
People from the Russian Empire of German descent